The Sandhubel is a mountain of the Plessur Alps, located south of Arosa in the canton of Graubünden. It lies north of the Guggernellgrat.

References

External links

 Sandhubel on Hikr

Mountains of the Alps
Mountains of Graubünden
Mountains of Switzerland